Porolepis is an extinct genus of porolepiform sarcopterygian fish, from the Early Devonian Dniester Series of Ukraine, which is rich in Porolepis remains, and also the Nellen Koepfchen Beds of Germany. It lived alongside the dubious lophotrochozoan Macrodontophion. It was first described in 1858 but Porolepis was not named as a sufficient species until 1891.

See also

 Sarcopterygii
 List of sarcopterygians
 List of prehistoric bony fish

References

Prehistoric lobe-finned fish genera
Fossil taxa described in 1891